The following is a partial list of the "N" codes for Medical Subject Headings (MeSH), as defined by the United States National Library of Medicine (NLM).

This list continues the information at List of MeSH codes (M01). Codes following these are found at List of MeSH codes (N02). For other MeSH codes, see List of MeSH codes.

The source for this content is the set of 2006 MeSH Trees from the NLM.

– population characteristics

– demography
  – age distribution
  – censuses
  – ethnic groups
  – family characteristics
  – birth intervals
  – birth order
  – marital status
  – divorce
  – marriage
  – single person
  – single parent
  – widowhood
  – health status
  – geriatric assessment
  – nutritional status
  – population density
  – population dynamics
  – emigration and immigration
  – health transition
  – population control
  – population growth
  – population groups
  – residence characteristics
  – catchment area (health)
  – housing
  – housing for the elderly
  – public housing
  – residential mobility
  – sex distribution
  – sex ratio
  – vital statistics
  – life expectancy
  – life tables
  – quality-adjusted life years
  – morbidity
  – basic reproduction number
  – incidence
  – prevalence
  – mortality
  – cause of death
  – child mortality
  – fatal outcome
  – fetal mortality
  – hospital mortality
  – infant mortality
  – maternal mortality
  – survival rate
  – pregnancy rate
  – birth rate

– health
  – family health
  – holistic health
  – mental health
  – occupational health
  – oral health
  – physical fitness
  – public health
  – rural health
  – suburban health
  – urban health
  – women's health
  – world health

– population
  – rural population
  – suburban population
  – urban population

– socioeconomic factors
  – career mobility
  – educational status
  – employment
  – employment, supported
  – personnel downsizing
  – unemployment
  – workplace
  – family characteristics
  – marital status
  – divorce
  – marriage
  – single person
  – single parent
  – widowhood
  – income
  – pensions
  – Employee Retirement Income Security Act
  – salaries and fringe benefits
  – family leave
  – parental leave
  – health benefit plans, employee
  – Employee Retirement Income Security Act
  – sick leave
  – medical indigency
  – occupations
  – career mobility
  – poverty
  – poverty areas
  – social change
  – social class
  – social mobility
  – social conditions

The list continues at List of MeSH codes (N02).

N01